Jablůnka is a municipality and village in Vsetín District in the Zlín Region of the Czech Republic. It has about 2,000 inhabitants.

External links

Villages in Vsetín District